Clayrville may refer to:
 Claryville, Kentucky
 Claryville, Missouri
 Claryville, New York